The Confederate Monument in Mt. Sterling overlooking Mt. Sterling, Kentucky in Montgomery County, Kentucky, commemorates those who fought for the Confederate States of America.  It is inscribed by passages from the Bivouac of the Dead.

On July 17, 1997, the Confederate Monument in Mt. Sterling was one of sixty-one different monuments related to the Civil War in Kentucky placed on the National Register of Historic Places, as part of the Civil War Monuments of Kentucky Multiple Property Submission.

Gallery

See also
 Battle of Mt. Sterling (1864)

References

Civil War Monuments of Kentucky MPS
National Register of Historic Places in Montgomery County, Kentucky
Confederate States of America monuments and memorials in Kentucky
1880 sculptures
1880 establishments in Kentucky
Mount Sterling, Kentucky